Scott Z. Burns (born July 17, 1962) is an American filmmaker and playwright.

Career 
After graduating from the University of Minnesota, Burns began his career in advertising later becoming a television commercials director. He was part of the team at Goodby, Silverstein & Partners which created the original Got Milk? campaign.

Burns has written screenplays for The Bourne Ultimatum (2007), The Informant! (2009), and Contagion (2011) all of which feature Matt Damon. His films The Informant!, Contagion, and Side Effects (2013) were directed by Steven Soderbergh. Burns also produced the Academy Award-winning An Inconvenient Truth. He wrote and directed the 2019 film The Report, a drama about the secret torture program inside the CIA.

Public interest in Burns' 2011 film Contagion renewed during the COVID-19 pandemic, making it the seventh-most downloaded film on iTunes by March 6, 2020. He was interviewed by Variety about the film's resurgence and similarities to the active pandemic in March 2020; he said:

Early life and education 
Burns was born in Golden Valley, Minnesota and graduated summa cum laude in 1985 with a degree in English from the University of Minnesota. He currently lives in Los Angeles.

Filmography 
Films

Television

Play writer
 The Library (2014)

References

External links 

1962 births
American male screenwriters
University of Minnesota alumni
Living people
Film directors from Minnesota
American documentary film producers
People from Golden Valley, Minnesota
American television directors
Screenwriters from Minnesota
Film producers from Minnesota
American advertising people
21st-century American screenwriters
21st-century American male writers